Pempeliella aurorella is a species of snout moth. It is found in Russia.

The wingspan is about 23 mm.

References

Moths described in 1867
Phycitini